Peter Pinsent (born 1960), is a male former weightlifter who competed for Great Britain and England.

Weightlifting career
Pinsent represented Great Britain in the 1984 Summer Olympics.

He represented England and won a silver medal in the 90 kg middle-heavyweight division, at the 1982 Commonwealth Games in Brisbane, Queensland, Australia.

Personal life
His brother Steve Pinsent is also a former Olympic weightlifter.

References

1960 births
English male weightlifters
Commonwealth Games medallists in weightlifting
Commonwealth Games silver medallists for England
Weightlifters at the 1982 Commonwealth Games
Weightlifters at the 1984 Summer Olympics
Olympic weightlifters of Great Britain
Living people
Medallists at the 1982 Commonwealth Games